Abhishek Banerjee, is an Indian politician. He is a member of the All India Trinamool Congress and he is currently serving as a Member of Parliament, Diamond Harbour (Lok Sabha constituency), South 24 Parganas, West Bengal since 2014. Banerjee has also been the National President of All India Trinamool Youth Congress since 2011, the youth wing of the All India Trinamool Congress, currently in power in the Indian state of West Bengal.

Abhishek Banerjee has served as a member of the Standing Committee of Commerce in 2014. He was also selected as a member of the Consultative Committee under the Ministry of Finance and Corporate affairs in 2014. He had served as a member of Railway Convention Committee (R.C.C.) from April 2015 to May 2019.

He currently serves as a member of Standing Committee of External Affairs since September 2019.
On 5 June 2021 he was appointed as the general secretary of All India Trinamool Congress.

He is also a founder of Diamond Harbour FC.

Personal life
Abhishek Banerjee is the nephew of West Bengal Chief Minister Mamata Banerjee. He was born and raised in Kolkata, India. Banerjee attended Nava Nalanda High School and M.P. Birla Foundation Higher Secondary School both in Kolkata. Later, Banerjee moved to Delhi and pursued his BBA and MBA in Human Resource and Marketing from the, controversial and now defunct, Indian Institute of Planning and Management (IIPM), New Delhi in 2009. Banerjee married Rujira Banerjee on 24 February 2012. He has two children, a daughter named Azania and a son named Aayansh.

Political career
Abhishek Banerjee joined politics as a member of All India Trinamool Congress in 2011 after the party had uprooted 34 years of Communist Party of India led Left Front regime by winning the Assembly Election in the same year. Abhishek Banerjee was recognised as the youth icon of All India Trinamool Congress when he was selected as the National President of All India Trinamool Youth Congress in 2011.

In 2014, Banerjee contested the Lok Sabha elections on behalf of All India Trinamool Congress as a candidate from the constituency of Diamond Harbour and won by a significant margin defeating the nearest opponent from Communist Party of India. At that time, Banerjee was the youngest parliamentarian in the lower house. He had also arranged the M.P. Cup Football Tournament in his constituency to inspire the youth to engage in sports and physical activities. After the successful completion of his first tenure, Banerjee won the 2019 Lok Sabha Election from Diamond Harbour with a margin of 320,594 votes, defeating the nearest opponent from BJP.

Controversies

Death of Debashish Acharya

In 2015, a person named Debashish Acharya slapped Abhishek at a public meeting after which Debashish was attacked by Trinamool Congress Party supporters. He was also arrested by the police. Later, Abhishek forgave him and he was released. Six years later, in June 2021, Debashish was found dead under mysterious circumstances. According to reports, Debashish was brought to the hospital by some unidentified people where the doctor declared him brought dead. His family claims that he was murdered by party goons.

In February 2020, Debasish had joined hands with BJP, ahead of the Assembly Election.

Coal Scam

He was accused in Coal smuggling scam in 2021. He was questioned twice by Enforcement Directorate on 6 September 2021 and 21 March 2022.

References

Trinamool Congress politicians from West Bengal
Indian politics articles by quality
Indian Institute of Planning and Management alumni
1987 births
Living people
India MPs 2014–2019
Lok Sabha members from West Bengal
People from South 24 Parganas district
India MPs 2019–present
Prisoners and detainees of India